Sarah Dyer Hobart (Dyer; pseudonym, Floyd Bentley; September 20, 1845 – November 1, 1921) was an American author of poetry, prose, and songs. Some of her more notable poems included, "The Record of Company B", "The Legend of St. Freda", and "Hector's Recompense". Her sonnets are perhaps her best work. She died in 1921.

Early life and education
Sarah Dyer was born in Otsego, Wisconsin Territory, September 20, 1845,  or 1846. Her father, Wayne Bidwell Dyer (1813–1899), was the first man to make a home in the town, having arrived in Otsego in May 1844. Her parents were among the earliest settlers in that part of Wisconsin, and her early life was that of a pioneer.

She became well-educated.

Career
She started her literary career at the age of eighteen, and was a contributor to the periodical press thereafter. Her poems soon made her name well known, and her sketches added to her popularity. Hobart's sonnets are perhaps her best work. For nearly fifty years, she wrote for the press using various pseudonyms. Her poems appeared in the leading magazines, including the Century, Lippincott's Magazine, Outing, and others. She was a regular contributor for a number of years to Harper's Bazar. As a regular prose contributor to the Toledo Blade, she wrote over the pen name of “Floyd Bentley.” By 1880, she had turned her attention almost exclusively to writing melodies.

Personal life
In 1866, she married Colonel Martin C. Hobart, who had just returned from the American Civil War. They had three children —Frances M., Mary V., and Burr E.— and lived in Fountain Prairie, Wisconsin.

Sarah Dyer Hobart died on November 1, 1921, and was buried at Fall River Cemetery, Fall River, Wisconsin.

Selected works

Poetry
 "The Record of Company B"
 "The Legend of St. Freda"
 "Hector's Recompense"

References

Attribution

External links
 
 

1845 births
1921 deaths
19th-century American poets
19th-century American women writers
19th-century pseudonymous writers
People from Columbia County, Wisconsin
American women poets
Pseudonymous women writers
People of Wisconsin Territory
People from Fountain Prairie, Wisconsin
Wikipedia articles incorporating text from A Woman of the Century